Merge, merging, or merger may refer to:

Concepts 
 Merge (traffic), the reduction of the number of lanes on a road
 Merge (linguistics), a basic syntactic operation in generative syntax in the Minimalist Program
 Merger (politics), the combination of two or more political or administrative entities
 Merger (phonology), phonological change whereby originally separate phonemes come to be pronounced exactly the same
 Mergers and acquisitions, the buying, selling, dividing and combining of different companies

Arts, entertainment, and media
 Merger (band), a 1970s English reggae band
 Merging (play), a 2007 one act play written by Charles Messina
 Merge Records, an indie-rock record label based in Chapel Hill, North Carolina
 Merge, a program broadcast by Lifetime

Computer science
 Merge (version control), to combine simultaneously changed files in revision control
 Merge (software), a Virtual Machine Monitor computer package for running MS-DOS or Windows 9x on x86 processors under UNIX
 Merge (SQL), a statement in SQL
 Merge algorithm, an algorithm for combining two or more sorted lists into a single sorted one
 Mail merge, the production of multiple documents from a single template form and a structured data source
 Randomness merger, a function which combines several, perhaps correlated, random variables into one high-entropy random variable

Other uses 
 Merger (horse) (born 1965), Canadian Thoroughbred racehorse
 ME Research UK, formerly MERGE, a UK charity funding biomedical research into Chronic fatigue syndrome

See also
 The Merger (disambiguation)
 Merger doctrine (disambiguation)
 Combine (disambiguation)